José Antonio "Ringo" Amaya Pardo (born 16 July 1980) is a retired Colombian footballer.

Amaya, who played as a defensive midfielder, was capped with the Colombian U-20 squad before being part of the senior squad that took part in Copa America 2004.

After Colombia did poorly at Copa América 2007, Amaya was chosen to lead the midfield. His performances in international friendlies and World Cup Qualifiers attracted attention, and Amaya was signed for one season by Barcelona S.C. in the Spanish leagues.

Amaya has won the Copa Mustang four times, once with Atlético Junior and three times with Atlético Nacional.

Statistics (Official games/Colombian Ligue and Colombian Cup)
(As of November 14, 2010)

References

External links
 

1980 births
Living people
Colombian footballers
Colombia international footballers
2004 Copa América players
Atlético Junior footballers
Atlético Nacional footballers
Millonarios F.C. players
Barcelona S.C. footballers
Patriotas Boyacá footballers
Categoría Primera A players
Ecuadorian Serie A players
Colombian expatriate footballers
Expatriate footballers in Ecuador
Association football midfielders
Footballers from Barranquilla